Moss Beach Distillery is a restaurant in Moss Beach, California, located on a cliff which overlooks the Pacific Ocean. It is officially designated as a California Point of Historical Interest. Originally established in 1927 as a speakeasy, it converted into a successful restaurant after the repeal of Prohibition in 1933.

History
The restaurant dates back to the Prohibition era when it was a speakeasy called Frank's Place. Owner Frank Torres built the club in 1927. Reportedly, illegal whisky was brought from ships, to the beach, and into vehicles for transport to San Francisco during Prohibition. A variety of people came to Frank's including the governor of California to Hollywood celebrities, such as actor Fatty Arbuckle.

Haunting
According to the restaurant's employees and guests, the "Blue Lady," a female apparition dressed in blue, is reportedly seen in and around the restaurant. However, on a 2009 episode of paranormal TV series Ghost Hunters, when the TAPS team was asked to come in and investigate, they found an elaborate system of devices meant to scare people, which the staff calls "haunted effects".

The Blue Lady was a woman who frequented the bar who always came dressed in blue. She was known as the "Blue Lady". The story goes that the lady was married and was having an affair with Torres' piano player named Charlie. One night, her estranged husband came in looking for her and caught them at the bar. He caused a scene and was tossed out by the bouncers. Later, that night, the lovers took a stroll down on the beach when a man, believed to be the husband ambushed them and stabbed his wife in the back. The next morning, she was found dead and her lover unconscious. This story was featured on Most Terrifying Places which aired on the Travel Channel in 2019.

References

External links
 Moss Beach Distillery website

1927 establishments in California
Buildings and structures in San Mateo County, California
Restaurants in the San Francisco Bay Area
Restaurants established in 1927